Ernest G. Lewis was a Welsh professional footballer who played as an inside forward. He made fourteen appearances in the Football League for Cardiff City.

References

Year of birth missing
Date of death missing
Footballers from Cardiff
Cardiff City F.C. players
English Football League players
Association football forwards
Welsh footballers